V is a 2020 Indian Telugu-language action thriller film written and directed by Mohana Krishna Indraganti and produced by Dil Raju under the banner of Sri Venkateswara Creations. The film stars Nani, Sudheer Babu, Nivetha Thomas and Aditi Rao Hydari along with Vennela Kishore and Tanikella Bharani in supporting roles. It marks Nani's 25th film as a lead actor, in which he plays an antihero for the first time in his career. In the film, a decorated police officer tries to hunt down a serial killer.

Principal photography began in May 2019, after the film's official announcement, and was shot predominantly across Hyderabad, Mumbai and Thailand, before the shooting wrapped in January 2020. The film's score is composed by S. Thaman, with the soundtrack album being composed by Amit Trivedi. The cinematography is handled by P. G. Vinda and editing done by Marthand K. Venkatesh.

After a scheduled theatrical release of 25 March 2020, coinciding with Ugadi, was postponed indefinitely due to COVID-19 pandemic, the film was released on Amazon Prime Video on 5 September 2020, thus becoming the first mainstream Telugu film to have a digital release. It received mixed reviews from critics, praising the principle cast performance, stylized action sequences, technical praise and direction but criticised its clichèd writing. However, it was the most watched Telugu film in a streaming platform in 2020. The film was re-released in theatres on 1 January 2021 following its digital release.
Babu, won the Critics Choice Award for Best Actor – Telugu, at the 10th South Indian International Movie Awards for his performance.

Plot
DCP Aditya handles a communal riot in Hyderabad. He is awarded a gallantry medal a year later, for solving various cases. The following night, Prasad, an Inspector, is grotesquely murdered by an unnamed killer who leaves a note challenging Aditya to catch him. Aditya suspects Apoorva, an aspiring crime novelist who he met the previous night, to have some link with the killer as she was in contact with Prasad. However, Apoorva only met Prasad for her research, during which she overhears Prasad telling a realtor named Mallik that their lives are under threat. 

Meanwhile, the killer calls Aditya, challenging him to prevent four more murders, failing which he shall give up his medals and resign. Aditya accepts the challenge. On deducing that the killer's name starts with "V", Aditya arrests a person Vicky, based on the history between him and Prasad. Vicky tells Aditya about a man who enquired about Prasad and Mallik. On knowing Mallik could be the next target, Aditya rushes to save him, only to see that he is already killed. The killer, this time, leaves a clue hinting next location of the target. Aditya and Apoorva crack the clue, and Aditya heads to Mumbai. 

The killer escapes narrowly, upon killing his target. He later sends Aditya an image of Aditya's school days, which makes Aditya suspect Vishnu, his fellow schoolmate, and a popular student-athlete. He learns from his school in Vizag that Vishnu is an ex-INA soldier with an impeccable record of eliminating terrorists. Aditya visits a colleague of Vishnu who tells their past.

Past: Vishnu loved and married Saheba, who he met when he was off-duty. However, when Saheba is pregnant, Vishnu, unable to get leave to visit her, was forced to attend his duty in Jammu and Kashmir. When Vishnu and his colleague are off to a mission, the bus they travel is bombed, falling into an adjacent river. Vishnu is last seen being washed away. Saheba, too is killed in the communal riots which Aditya handled, but there is no record of Saheba's death. 

Present: Upon investigation, Aditya learns that Saheba was last seen going to a jewelry shop to buy a gift for Vishnu, who was supposed to return soon. Aditya tries to retrieve the shop's CCTV footage, but it's missing. Aditya suspects the manager and asks his team to follow him. And they trace out a lady who reveals to them the conspiracy behind the riot. The lady ran a girls Hostel, but she would pimp the girls, often by force. One night, a girl finds her friend being murdered and films the incident where she takes the video to a local don Sadik Hassan, whom she believes would help him. But Sadik Hassan finds an opportunity to blackmail the Home Minister, whose son Ranjith is also behind the murders. The minister conspired to kill Sadik Hassan and retrieve the video. 

Aditya, who learns that people who are involved in the conspiracy are being killed, fails to protect the fourth target as well. The final target of the killer, the home minister's son, Ranjith, is in Thailand. Aditya travels to Thailand to save Ranjith, but Ranjith is beheaded by Vishnu, who leaves a note reading he shall meet soon. Later, Aditya resigns from his job, accepting his defeat. The police save their face by blaming and killing an innocent pickpocketer named Vamsi, and the case is closed. Days later, Vishnu and Aditya meet, where Aditya reveals that he indeed helped Vishnu by killing the guards of Ranjith, thus isolating him to be killed by Vishnu. He does so because his team is infiltrated on instruction to kill both Vishnu and Aditya.

Vishnu tells Aditya that Saheba, on the day of the riots, tried to save the girl with the video, only to be murdered by the goons. Vishnu, who was luckily saved after the accident, receives the video recorded and e-mailed by Saheba minutes before she was killed. He then decides to avenge her death. Vishnu initially believed that Aditya was also part of the conspiracy, but upon being impressed by his integrity, Vishnu hands over the video to Aditya, to expose the criminals. Aditya later releases it to the press and regains his job. Days later, Apoorva writes a novel about the events, titled Saheba. Vishnu, who receives a copy, sees that it has been dedicated to V.

Cast 

 Nani as Yendluri Vishnu
 Sudheer Babu as DCP N. Aditya
 Nivetha Thomas as Apuurva Raamaanuujan
 Aditi Rao Hydari as Saheba, Vishnu's Wife
 Vennela Kishore as Mansoor
 Tanikella Bharani as IG Y. V. Narendra
 Naresh as Aditya's father
 Rohini as Sreelata, Apuurva's mother
 Thalaivasal Vijay as Ramanujan, Apuurva's father
 Vinay Varma as Saadik Haasan
 Harish Uthaman as Ranjith
 Adarsh Balakrishna as Sarath Chandra
 Ravi Varma as K.K.
 Madhusudhan Rao as Mallikarjun
 Raja Chembolu as Rathnakumar
 Srikanth Iyyengar as Rashiid
 Jayaprakash as DGP T. Jayaraj
 Ananda Chakrapani as Home Minister
 Rajitha as Ramani
Getup Srinu
Vaibhavi Joshi as an item number in Ranga Rangeli
 Sathyasai Srinivas as DCP B. SatyaKumar

Production

Development 
Originally, Mohana Krishna Indraganti planned a sequel for his 2016 film Gentleman, with Nani and Sharwanand in the lead roles. In December 2018, Dulquer Salmaan was approached to star in the film soon after Sharwanand's exit, but, however, he could not act in the film due to prior commitments. Sudheer Babu was later confirmed to play a lead role, marking his second collaboration with Indraganti after Sammohanam (2018). In March 2019, sources claimed that Nani's film is not a sequel to Gentleman, but a neo-noir crime thriller with a fresh script. The actor was reported to play a character with negative shades, whereas Babu will be seen as a cop.

In March 2019, Aditi Rao Hydari signed to be a part of the lead cast. The film marked Hydari's second collaboration with Babu and Indraganti after Sammohanam. Nivetha Thomas' presence was confirmed in April 2019.  Bollywood composer Amit Trivedi signed in to score music for the film, the very same month, marking his second Telugu film after Sye Raa Narasimha Reddy (2019). On 29 April 2019, the makers announced the titular poster of the film, being titled as V, also marking Nani's 25th film, featuring him in a negative role for the first time.

Filming 
Principal photography of began in April 2019 while its second schedule started on 12 June 2019 with Babu and other artists. Babu allotted a call sheet of 30 days, for the second schedule. Nani started shooting for the film on 11 August 2019. In September 2019, filming location changed to Thailand where major scenes were shot with Babu and Nani, with the former being hurt while filming an action sequence. The makers shot few action sequences at a forest located at Phuket, which was wrapped up in October 2019. The shooting of the film was wrapped up in January 2020.

Music 

The film score is composed by S. Thaman. The soundtrack album is composed by Amit Trivedi, in his third Telugu film after Sye Raa Narasimha Reddy (2019) and That is Mahalakshmi (2020), whereas the lyrics were written by Sirivennela Seetharama Sastry, Ramajogayya Sastry and Krishna Kanth. On 24 February 2020, coinciding with actor Nani's birthday, the first single "Manasu Maree" was released by Aditya Music. The second single "Vastunnaa Vachestunna" was released on 10 March 2020. The soundtrack album was released on 29 August 2020.

123Telugu reviewed "The album of V is quite modern and at the same time has a classical touch to it. The emotion and mood of the film are carried through the songs and Amit Trivedi has done a solid job with the songs. Manasu Maree and Vastunna Vacchestunna are already solid hits but the other songs are also good making this a foot-tapping album. You will like them, even more, when the film is out."

Release 
The film was initially scheduled to release on 25 March 2020 coinciding with Ugadi, but was postponed due to the COVID-19 pandemic lockdown in India. In June 2020, Nani refuted rumours of a direct release, through over-the-top media services, and confirmed that the film is scheduled for a theatrical release. In August 2020, the makers decided to release the film directly on a streaming platform, after the uncertainty over the reopening of theatres, which were closed due to the COVID-19 lockdown.

On 20 August, the makers officially announced that the film would be released through Amazon Prime Video on 5 September 2020. The release date coincided with Nani's debut in the film industry, after his 2008 film Ashta Chamma, which is also directed by Mohana Krishna Indraganti. The film became one of the first major Telugu films, to be released directly on a streaming platform.

Amazon Prime Video premiered the film eventually on 4 September, ahead of the scheduled release date, and it was dubbed in Tamil, Malayalam and Kannada, which had a release on the same day. The makers re-released the film in theatres on 1 January 2021, coinciding with New Year's Day. The Hindi dubbed version began streaming on Prime Video from 4 April 2021.

Reception 
Sangeetha Devi Dundoo of The Hindu, wrote that "V could have benefited with a far more engaging story. As it stands now, it’s a pale story that doesn’t make you root for its prime characters." Hemanth Kumar of the Firstpost, who rated the film 2.5 out of five, also noted "V is a Telugu film, and if a top star is portrayed as an anti-hero, he cannot be a diabolical person at any cost." Haricharan Pudipeddi of The Hindustan Times reviewed "V is a major misfire from Indraganti, whose intent to go big fails gloriously. For Nani, who had bet a lot on this film, it will go down as a big disappointment. If only Nani took some inspiration in storytelling from his last production venture, HIT, a gripping investigative thriller, V could have been a far better film."

Manoj Kumar of The Indian Express granted the film 2.5 stars out of five and wrote, "Indraganti has gone the extra mile while writing scenes for Vishnu...However, Mohana doesn’t show an equal amount of love for other key characters", and gave a verdict "V is not the popcorn movie that we deserve but the one we need right now." Janaki K. of India Today who also rated 2.5 out of five, wrote that "Director Mohan Krishna Indraganti’s V had a solid premise that could have been made into a slick thriller. With shortcomings in the screenplay, V doesn’t excite you as it intended to. Nonetheless, certain moments will make it an interesting watch."

Neetishta Nyayapati of The Times of India, gave 3 out of 5 and wrote, "Mohan Krishna Indraganti takes a gamble and tries to show that he can do more than make feel-good dramas. And the film he shows, despite the predictability, definitely has the potential to be more. If only it rose beyond the usual tropes. This is not an unwatchable film by any measure, because it definitely has its moments that will make you want to know what comes next." Gauthaman Bhaskaran of News18 gave the film 1.5 out of 5 stating, "The film lacks a thoughtful approach on the director's part. In its runtime of 140-minutes, V hardly offers anything to look forward to." Baradwaj Rangan of Film Companion wrote "This super-predictable film, like Vs cigarettes, is a hash. It’s a movie about murders that’s impossible to take seriously. It’s a comedy of terrors." Sify gave the film 3 out of 5 and stated "V is a revenge drama that has weak writing. Clichéd and predictable later portions have marred the mood."

Legal issues
On 2 March 2021, the Bombay High Court ordered Amazon Prime Video to take down all versions of the film until they removed the image of Mumbai-based actress Sakshi Malik used without her consent. On 4 March 2021, the court allowed the film's re-release after Malik confirmed that the deletion was satisfactory.

Accolades

Notes

References

External links 

Indian direct-to-video films
2020s Telugu-language films
Films shot in Hyderabad, India
Indian action thriller films
Indian crime action films
Indian chase films
Amazon Prime Video original films
Films shot in Telangana
Films shot in Thailand
Films postponed due to the COVID-19 pandemic
2020 films
Films directed by Mohan Krishna Indraganti
Films scored by Amit Trivedi
Films scored by Thaman S
Films not released in theaters due to the COVID-19 pandemic
2020 direct-to-video films
Films set in Hyderabad, India
Films set in Thailand
Films set in Jammu and Kashmir
Films set in Andhra Pradesh
Films set in Mumbai
2020 action thriller films
2020 crime action films
Sri Venkateswara Creations films